Sergeant First Class Agustín Ramos Calero (June 2, 1919 – February 10, 1989) was awarded 22 decorations and medals from the U.S. Army for his actions during World War II, thus becoming the most decorated Puerto Rican and Hispanic soldier in the United States military during that war.

Early years 
Calero was born and raised in the town of Isabela, Puerto Rico, which is located in the northern region of Puerto Rico. The economic situation in Puerto Rico during the 1930s was difficult as a result of the Great Depression. Due to the shortage of jobs in the island, many Puerto Ricans joined the United States Army which offered a guaranteed income.

World War II 
In 1941, Calero joined the Army and was assigned to Puerto Rico's 65th Infantry Regiment at Camp Las Casas in Santurce, Puerto Rico. There he received his training as a rifleman. Upon the outbreak of World War II, Calero was reassigned to the Third U.S. Infantry Division and sent to Europe. In 1945, Calero's company was in the vicinity of Colmar, France and engaged in combat against a squad of German soldiers in what is known as the Battle of Colmar Pocket. Calero attacked the squad, killing ten of them and capturing 21 shortly before being wounded himself. Following these events, he was nicknamed "One-Man Army" by his comrades. For these actions he was awarded the Silver Star. Calero had been wounded a total of four times in Europe when the war ended. He was awarded a total of 22 decorations and medals for his actions, making him the Puerto Rican soldier with the most military decorations in all of the United States during that conflict.

Korean War 
Calero returned to Puerto Rico and was reassigned once more to the 65th Infantry Regiment. The 65th Infantry departed from Puerto Rico on August 26, 1950, when the United States became involved in the Korean War. They arrived in Pusan, Korea on September 23. In Korea, Calero was assigned to Headquarters and Headquarters Company of the regiment. He was the personal assistant to the regimental commander, Brigadier General (then Colonel) William W. Harris.

Later years 
Calero retired from the U.S. Army in 1962 after total of 21 years of service. He retired with the rank of Sergeant First Class. At the end of his years, Calero suffered from terminal cancer. Sergeant First Class Agustín Ramos Calero died on February 10, 1989, at 69 years of age and was buried with full military honors in the Puerto Rico National Cemetery in Bayamón, Puerto Rico. His hometown, Isabela, honored his memory by naming an avenue after him.

Notes

Military awards and decorations 
Among Calero's decorations were the following:

Foreign unit decorations.
 Fourragère cord, granted by France to the Third Infantry Division.

The Bravery Gold Medal of Greece was given  by the Government of Greece to the 65th Infantry Regiment and to the members of the regiment who fought in the Korean War.
   Chryssoun Aristion Andrias (Bravery Gold Medal of Greece)
Congressional Gold Medal

On June 10, 2014, President Barack Obama, signed the legislation known as  "The Borinqueneers CGM Bill" at an official ceremony. The Bill honors the 65th Infantry Regiment with the Congressional Gold Medal.

See also 

List of Puerto Ricans
List of Puerto Rican military personnel
65th Infantry Regiment
Puerto Ricans in World War II
Borinqueneers Congressional Gold Medal

References

Further reading
Puertorriquenos Who Served With Guts, Glory, and Honor. Fighting to Defend a Nation Not Completely Their Own, by Greg Boudonck,

External links 
 Who was Agustín Ramos Calero?. Retrieved November 19, 2006.
The Puerto Rican Soldier News. Retrieved November 19, 2006.
Puerto Rico National Cemetery, Bayamón, Puerto Rico. Retrieved November 19, 2006.

1919 births
1989 deaths
United States Army non-commissioned officers
United States Army personnel of World War II
United States Army personnel of the Korean War
People from Isabela, Puerto Rico
Puerto Rican Army personnel
Recipients of the Croix de Guerre 1939–1945 (France)
Recipients of the Silver Star